Pipa is a town in Fushun County, Zigong, Sichuan province, China. , it administers Pipachang Residential Community and the following 12 villages:
Fu'an Village
Lice Village
Shunjiang Village
Aijia Village
Dongshang Village
Shigong Village
Tudi Village
Qingfeng Village
Xujia Village
Nongchang Village
Jinzhu Village
Qingshan Village

See also 
 List of township-level divisions of Sichuan

References 

Towns in Sichuan
Fushun County, Sichuan